Ryan William Stratulis is an English professional footballer who plays as a midfielder for  club Tranmere Rovers.

Career
Stratulis made his senior debut for Tranmere Rovers on 9 November 2021, playing the full ninety minutes of a 3–2 win over Oldham Athletic in an EFL Trophy fixture at Prenton Park. On 20 November, he joined Marine of the Northern Premier League Division One West on a one-month loan.

Career statistics

References

Living people
English footballers
Association football midfielders
Tranmere Rovers F.C. players
Marine F.C. players
English Football League players
Northern Premier League players
Year of birth missing (living people)